Team Newcastle Knights are a basketball team based in the city of Newcastle upon Tyne, England. The Knights compete in NBL Division 1, the second tier of the British basketball system, which they were promoted to in 2020.  The NBL side, having entered the league in 2014, is primarily based on the Newcastle University team that competes in the British Universities and Colleges Sport league, with the addition of other professional players based in the north east.   The team's head coach is Mark Elderkin, who assists the coaching team of the Newcastle Eagles, with whom the Knights have a player development pathway.

Players

Current roster

Notable former players

Season-by-season records

References

External links
Official website

Basketball teams in England